Pagasa may refer to:
Pagasa (genus), an insect genus in the family Nabidae
PAGASA, an acronym for the Philippine Atmospheric, Geophysical and Astronomical Services Administration 
"May Pagasa", a pen-name of José Rizal
Pagasa, alternate spelling of Pagasae, a city of ancient Thessaly

See also
 Pag-asa (disambiguation)